Lucas is a city in Collin County, Texas, United States. As of the 2010 census the population was 5,166, up from 2,890 at the 2000 census; in 2020, its population was 7,612.

Geography
It is bordered by Fairview to the north, Allen to the west, Parker to the southwest, Wylie to the south, St. Paul to the southeast, Wylie again to the southeast, and Lavon Lake to the east.

Lucas is home to two parks, Kenneth R. Lewis Park and Lucas Community Park. Kenneth R. Lewis Park is equipped with Softball and Soccer fields, a paved walking trail, and a pavilion Park Map. Lucas Community Park has a Main Area with a capacity 80, Mini Kitchenette, Tables available (6 max), and Chairs available (40 max, 20 on Thursday).

Demographics

As of the 2020 United States census, there were 7,612 people, 2,590 households, and 2,170 families residing in the city. At the 2000 census there were 2,890 people in 945 households, including 855 families, in the city. The population density was 314.3 people per square mile (121.3/km2). There were 962 housing units at an average density of 104.6 per square mile (40.4/km2).

In 2000, the racial makup of the city was 80.44% White, 8.42% African American, 0.52% Native American, 0.28% Asian, 0.03% Pacific Islander, 1.00% from other races, and 1.31% from two or more races. Hispanic or Latino of any race were 11.56%.

Of the 945 households 44.9% had children under the living with them, 83.2% were married couples living together, 4.0% had a female householder with no husband present, and 9.5% were non-families. 7.5% of households were one person and 1.8% were one person aged 65 or older. The average household size was 3.06 and the average family size was 3.22.

The age distribution was 30.2% under 18, 5.3% from 18 to 24, 28.8% from 25 to 44, 29.1% from 45 to 64, and 6.6% 65 or older. The median age was 39 years. For every 100 females, there were 98.9 males. For every 100 females age 18 and over, there were 97.9 males.

According to the 2000 census, the median household income was $100,220 and the median family income  was $101,014. Males had a median income of $72,471 versus $38,182 for females. The per capita income for the city was $34,020. About 3.9% of families and 4.1% of the population were below the poverty line, including 3.7% of those under age 18 and 5.0% of those age 65 or over.

Schools
The city of Lucas has seven different school districts and private schools within the city limits.  The six school districts are as follows:
 Lovejoy Independent School District 
 Allen Independent School District
 McKinney Independent School District 
 Plano Independent School District
 Princeton Independent School District 
 Wylie Independent School District 
 
The private Lucas Christian Academy is also in the city.

References

External links
 City of Lucas official website

Dallas–Fort Worth metroplex
Cities in Texas
Cities in Collin County, Texas